Lucien Turcotte Pacaud (September 21, 1879 – March 5, 1960) was a Canadian lawyer and political figure. He represented Mégantic in the House of Commons of Canada from 1911 to 1922 as a Liberal member.

He was born in Trois-Rivières, Quebec, in 1879, the son of Ernest Pacaud and the grandson of Joseph-Édouard Turcotte. He was educated at Bishop's College and Laval University. Pacaud was admitted to the bar in 1904 and practised at Quebec City and then at Thetford Mines. In 1908, he married Helen Elizabeth Buckmall. Pacaud served as police commissioner for the Transcontinental Railway from 1907 to 1911. He was Parliamentary Under Secretary of State for External Affairs, a non-cabinet post, from 1921 to 1922. He served as Secretary to the Canadian High Commissioner at London from 1922 to 1931. In 1930, Pacaud served as acting Canadian High Commissioner to the United Kingdom after the death of Peter Charles Larkin.

See also 
List of Bishop's College School alumni

References 
 Canadian Parliamentary Guide, 1921, EJ Chambers

External links 
 
12th Ministry - Privy Council Office
Head of Posts list - Canadian Foreign Affairs
Les avocats de la région de Québec, PG Roy (1936)

1879 births
1960 deaths
Liberal Party of Canada MPs
Members of the House of Commons of Canada from Quebec
High Commissioners of Canada to the United Kingdom
People from Trois-Rivières
Bishop's College School alumni
Université Laval alumni